Mervyn Sandri (20 January 1932 – 16 January 2016) was a New Zealand cricketer. He played one first-class match for Otago in 1956/57.

See also
 List of Otago representative cricketers

References

External links
 

1932 births
2016 deaths
New Zealand cricketers
Otago cricketers
People from Roxburgh, New Zealand